Leslie Clifford Jones (1 January 1930 – 6 January 2016) was a Welsh footballer who played as a full back for Luton Town and Aston Villa in the 1950s.

Luton Town

Jones' first game was at Kenilworth Road on 28 April 1951, the penultimate game of the 1950–51 season.
He made three more appearances the following season but established himself in the team during the 1952–53 season, which included playing in every FA Cup game before being knocked out by Bolton Wanderers who would finish runners-up. In January the same season he scored the only goal of his career in a 2–0 home win over Fulham. His last appearance for the Hatters was in December 1957 at Portsmouth.

Aston Villa
Jones made his Aston Villa debut, after moving from Luton Town in January, on 1 February 1958. He only made four more appearances for Villa, all in that 1957–58 season.

Worcester City
Jones moved to Worcester City in July 1959.

Playing career

References

External links
 

1930 births
2016 deaths
People from Mountain Ash, Wales
Sportspeople from Rhondda Cynon Taf
Welsh footballers
Association football fullbacks
Luton Town F.C. players
Aston Villa F.C. players
Worcester City F.C. players
English Football League players